The Old Red Hippopotamus is the second novel by Hussein Bassir, following In Search For Khnum, and was published in 2005 by the Egyptian General Organization of the Book of Cairo. Like the previous novel, this new story is inspired by the legacy of ancient Egypt, while using modern stylistic techniques to express poetic and legendary happenings. This new adventure describes a fiction whose allusions and implications could almost place the reader in contemporary Egypt.

Plot summary

The first chapter of the novel is called ‘Desher Wer,’ which means ‘old red’ in Ancient Egyptian. This term for the hippopotamus, of outstanding longevity milestone, gives the novel its title ‘The Old Red’.

Before the reader meets the Old Red, he begins to discover the village of 'Per Mora' or ‘the House of Mora’, who is the goddess of the village, the giant goddess of fertility and love, because most events take place on its area.

Then the reader meets the grandfather Anatem, the legendary founder of the village. From him is descended Onan, the main character and master of the places with which the second chapter of the novel is particularly concerned.

Then the reader discovers the eternal lake which the villagers and the other artisans depend on for their food by fishing.

Finally, the reader begins to learn about ‘the old red hippopotamus,’ the lord of the lake and exclusive controller of the village and its people. Readers will appreciate the human side of the ‘old red’ as he waits for the birth of his offspring, in a state of stress and anxiety that develops during foaling as he dreams of perhaps this time having a male baby to inherit his kingdom.  The reader also learns about the villagers and their activities and also the goddess Mora, the beautiful brunette mistress of the village.

The real torment for the villagers is that as they sleep during the night, hippopotami eat the harvest they have struggled to grow. So they seek revenge on his herd of hippos and their leader the Old Red. After careful planning, Naram, the only son of the master of the village Onan, makes a trap with which he manages to catch the small hippopotamus, the only son of the Old Red, the master of the lake. The furious Old Red decides on reprisals against the entire village and it attacks and kills both Naram, the only son of the village master Onan, and his wife Myriam as they sail in a felucca in the middle of the lake. However, it pushes the cradle of their baby Asheel to the shore but despite this kindness, rivalry increases between the Old Red the master of the lake and Onan master of the village.

The second chapter of the novel, entitled ‘Onan,’ begins with his biography and the reason for his revenge on the Old Red for killing his son after the murder of his offspring, the little red. The chapter ends with the disappearance of Onan and his execution by the ‘old red’.

The third and final chapter of the novel, entitled ‘Oshtata’ concerns the most heroic of women, Oshtata, who is Onan's wife and the mother of Naram. She decides to avenge her husband and her son. After an interminable and exhausting battle with ‘the old red’, she herself dies, thinking that she has succeeded in getting rid of him.

The novel ends in an enigmatic spiral that affirms the continuity of an eternal struggle between human and divine will. The idea of revenge can destroy human life, as is shown by most of the novel's characters who fail to realize their hopes.

Egyptian novels
2005 novels
Novels set in ancient Egypt
Arabic-language novels
Fictional hippopotamuses
Novels about animals